Help! was an American satire magazine that was published by James Warren from 1960 to 1965. It was Harvey Kurtzman's longest-running magazine project after leaving Mad and EC Publications, and during its five years of operation it was chronically underfunded, yet innovative.

In starting Help!, Kurtzman brought along several artists from his Mad collaborations, including Will Elder, Jack Davis, John Severin and Al Jaffee.

Kurtzman's assistants included Charles Alverson, Terry Gilliam and Gloria Steinem; the last was helpful in gathering the celebrity comedians who appeared on the covers and the fumetti strips the magazine ran along with more traditional comics and text pieces. Among the then little-known performers in the fumetti were John Cleese, Woody Allen and Milt Kamen; better-known performers such as Orson Bean were also known to participate. Some of the fumetti were scripted by Bernard Shir-Cliff.

At Help!, Gilliam met Cleese for the first time, resulting in their collaboration years later on Monty Python's Flying Circus. Cleese appeared in a Gilliam fumetto written by David Crossley, "Christopher's Punctured Romance". The tale concerns a man who is shocked to learn that his daughter's new "Barbee" doll has "titties"; however, he falls in love with the doll and has an affair. Gilliam appeared on two covers of Help! and along with the rest of the creative team, appeared in crowd scenes in several fumetti.

The magazine introduced young talents who went on to influential careers in underground comix as well as the mainstream: among them Robert Crumb, Gilbert Shelton and Jay Lynch. Algis Budrys and other science fiction writers were regular contributors of prose and scripts to the magazine.

Working with a minimal budget, Kurtzman relied on a combination of cheap up-and-coming talent, favors called in to "name" friends (such as cover poses by Jackie Gleason, Mort Sahl or Jerry Lewis) and inexpensive page-fillers (such as inserting dialogue balloons into news photos and publicity stills).

Somewhat more adult and risque than Mad, Help! was nonetheless less sexually explicit or taboo-breaking than the contemporaneous The Realist or the later underground comix and National Lampoon were or would be. 

The magazine got into some hot water in 1962, thanks to a story in the February 1962 issue called "Goodman Goes Playboy" in which the Archie Comics cast were seduced by the Playboy lifestyle and sold their souls to Satan (aka Playboy founder Hugh Hefner). Archie Comics sued Warren, and settled out of court for $1,000 and a published apology. The spat resurfaced in December when the story was reprinted in a book; another settlement was reached in 1963 promising never to reprint the story again.

A total of 26 issues were printed before the magazine folded in 1965. Volume one (Aug. 1960–Sept. 1961) had 12 issues, and 14 issues comprised the second volume (Feb. 1962–Sept. 1965).

Notable contributors
 Woody Allen
 Charles Alverson
 Orson Bean
 Algis Budrys
 John Cleese
 Robert Crumb
 Jack Davis
 Will Elder
 Terry Gilliam
 Al Jaffee
 Milt Kamen
 Harvey Kurtzman
 Jay Lynch
 John Severin
 Gilbert Shelton
 Gloria Steinem
 Heinrich Kley

References

External links

1960 comics debuts
1965 comics endings
Satirical magazines published in the United States
Comics magazines published in the United States
Defunct magazines published in the United States
Magazines established in 1960
Magazines disestablished in 1965
Magazines edited by Harvey Kurtzman
Satirical comics
Underground comix
Photocomics
Warren Publishing titles
1960s in comedy